The Nevada State Police (NSP), also known as the Nevada Department of Public Safety (DPS) from roughly 1949 to 2021, is the state police and highway patrol agency of Nevada, with state-wide jurisdiction. The Nevada State Police also encompass the Division of Parole and Probation, the Capitol Police Division, the Division of Investigations, the Office of Professional Responsibility, the Fire Marshall Division and the Records, Compliance and Communications Division as well as various other smaller entities.

The Nevada State Police is a rebranding of the Nevada Department of Public Safety. The NSP's headquarters are located in Carson City, with regional commands in Reno, Elko, and Las Vegas.

History 
In 1908, the Nevada State Police was created to provide a state level law enforcement presence as a result of labor strikes in Nevada's mining communities. When automobiles became available in the early 20th century, the problem of enforcing the laws of the road soon followed. On June 23, 1923, the first Nevada State Highway Patrolman was hired by the Nevada Highway Department under the supervision of the Inspector of the Nevada State Police. This officer and the Inspector of the State Police would travel throughout the State collecting automobile registration fees and enforcing the laws of the highway. Nevada was one of the first western states to have an organized highway patrol function.

By 1934, the highway patrol force had grown to three officers still supervised by the Inspector of the State Police. They were given silver patrol cars with gold stars on the door, red lights and sirens, and told to patrol the roads. One officer was assigned to Las Vegas, Reno and Elko.

This part of the Nevada State Police remained operational until the State Police were reorganized in 1943. At that time, the Nevada State Highway Patrol was absorbed into the State Police who continued highway law enforcement until 1949 when the Nevada Highway Patrol was organized.

The 1949 Nevada Legislature created the Nevada Highway Patrol by consolidating the Nevada State Police, Inspectors from the Nevada Public Service Commission and several Inspectors from the Nevada Department of Taxation. On July 1, 1949, the Nevada Highway Patrol Division was created within the Nevada Public Service Commission. These officers were directed to act as field agents and inspectors in the enforcement of the State laws as they pertained to Nevada highways.

In 1957, the Legislature created the Department of Motor Vehicles and transferred the Nevada Highway Patrol to this new department as a division.

In 1985, the name of the Department was changed to the Department of Motor Vehicles and Public Safety (DMV&PS) to reflect the law enforcement agencies that had been added.  At the same time, Fifty-two Field Enforcement Agents of the Motor Carrier Division of the Department of Motor Vehicles were transferred to the Nevada Highway Patrol and consolidated with existing Commercial Vehicle Safety Officers of the Nevada Highway Patrol to form the Commercial Enforcement Bureau within the NHP.

In 2001, DMV&PS was split into separate departments and the Nevada Highway Patrol is now a division of the Nevada Department of Public Safety.

In 2005, NHP opened a new communications center and emergency operations center in Clark County.

In 2007, DPS Northern Nevada Communications center moved from the Reno Northern Command Headquarters into the State Emergency Operations Center in Nevada's capital city, Carson City.

The Nevada Highway Patrol issues its officers a variety of non-lethal weapons, such as tasers, pepper spray, and a baton. The NHP also issues its troopers take-home cars.

In 2020, the first female colonel, Colonel Anne Carpenter, was served as the third chief since October 19, 2020. She was confirmed by the Nevada Senate on October 19, 2020.

In 2021, the Nevada Department of Public Safety announced that the agency would rebrand from the Nevada Highway Patrol to the Nevada State Police.

In February 2021, the Nevada State Police seized $87,000 from a combat veteran without alleging any crimes. The veteran was travelling through Nevada to see his daughters in California, and sued the NSP to get his money back.

Badge and rank structure

Commands 

Headquarters  (Carson City)
Northern Command  (Reno)
Central Command  (Elko)
Southern Command  (Las Vegas)

Demographics 
Reference
Male: 94%
Female: 6%
White: 89%
Hispanic: 5%
African-American/Black: 3%
Asian: 3%

Flight operations 

The NSP flight operations unit consisted of three fixed-wing aircraft.  The aircraft were predominantly used for speed enforcement, prisoner transport and personnel transport. The planes were additionally used for emergency blood delivery and to assist other law enforcement agencies.

NSP discontinued use of their flight operations in 2010.

Fleet 
 Cessna Skylane 182 RG based in Las Vegas
 Cessna Centurion 210 RG based in Carson City
 Cessna Cutlass 172 RG based in Elko

Fallen officers 
Since the creation of the Nevada State Police, Ten officers have died while on duty.

The causes of death are as follows:

See also 

 List of law enforcement agencies in Nevada
 Denver S. Dickerson
 Capitol Police

References

External links 
Nevada State Police

State law enforcement agencies of Nevada
Government agencies established in 1908
1908 establishments in Nevada
Cannabis eradication